Jay Preston Barnes (August 9, 1869 – May 8, 1943) was an American politician who served as  Mayor of Pittsfield, Massachusetts.

Family life
On October 25, 1894 Barnes married Mary Henrietta Dutton, the daughter of John and Henrietta M. (Tuthill) Dutton, they had a son, Harold Dutton Barnes, born on September 28, 1895.

Notes

1869 births
1943 deaths
Massachusetts city council members
Mayors of Pittsfield, Massachusetts